Prisoners of Darkness (Italian: Prigionieri delle tenebre) is a 1952 Italian historical drama film directed by Enrico Bomba and starring Milly Vitale, Folco Lulli and Eduardo Ciannelli. The film's sets were designed by the art director Virgilio Marchi. It is based on the 1852 novel La cieca di Sorrento by Francesco Mastriani.

Plot 
Bourbon Naples. Oliviero Pisani is the son of Amedeo Pisani, who kills the Marchesa Rionero during a theft in the villa of the Rionero marquises. Oliviero goes to study in London and becomes a great ophthalmologist who will restore sight to the daughter of the marquise, Beatrice, who became blind due to Amedeo during the robbery in the villa.

Cast
 Milly Vitale as Beatrice Rionero
 Folco Lulli as Amedeo Pisani 
 Eduardo Ciannelli as Marquis Rionero 
 Lucien Gallas as Tommaso Basileo
 Giulia Lazzarini as Tina
 Franco Malavasi as Totonno
 Roberto Bruni as Cav. Amadeo Checco 
 Armando Francioli as Oliviero Pisani
 Alberto Farnese 	 		
 Franco Pesce

References

Bibliography
 Chiti, Roberto & Poppi, Roberto. Dizionario del cinema italiano: Dal 1945 al 1959. Gremese Editore, 1991.

External links
 

1952 films
1950s Italian-language films
Melodrama films
Italian drama films
1952 drama films
Italian black-and-white films
1950s Italian films
Films set in the 19th century
Films set in Naples
1950s historical films
Italian historical films
Films based on Italian novels